Rahaf Mohammed (formerly Rahaf Mohammed Mutlaq al-Qunun Al-Shammari) is a Saudi refugee and author who was detained by Thai authorities on 5 January 2019 while transiting through Bangkok airport, en route from Kuwait to Australia.

She had intended to claim asylum in Australia and escape her family who she says abused her and threatened to kill her for, among other reasons, leaving Islam, an act that is a capital offence under Saudi law. After she had appealed for help on Twitter and gained significant attention, Thai authorities abandoned their plans to forcibly return her to Kuwait (from where she would be repatriated to Saudi Arabia), and she was taken under the protection of the United Nations High Commissioner for Refugees and granted refugee status. On 11 January 2019 she was granted asylum in Canada and arrived in Toronto the next day.

Early life 

Rahaf was born on 11 March 2000. Her father is the town governor of al-Sulaimi in the Ha'il Region. She has nine siblings.

She has claimed that her family had locked her up for months, subjecting her to physical and psychological abuse. Her father however denied abusing her. Rahaf also said that her cousin threatened to kill her because she no longer follows Islam. Public apostasy in Islam is a crime punishable by death according to the Sharia law of Saudi Arabia.

Detention at the airport hotel 

While Mohammed was on vacation with her family in Kuwait, she left them and boarded a flight to Bangkok, Thailand. She intended to continue on another flight to seek asylum in Australia. A tourist visa had been issued to her that permitted entry into Australia. Her family reportedly filed a missing person report after her escape from Kuwait. Upon arrival at Suvarnabhumi Airport in Bangkok, a man greeted her, not disclosing that he was a Saudi embassy official, and told her that he needed her passport so that he could help her obtain a Thai visa. He left with her passport and did not return. Mohammed never intended to leave the airport's transit area and therefore did not require a Thai visa.

She was detained by Thai authorities at the Miracle Transit Hotel within the airport.

Mohammed opened an account on Twitter which spread rapidly because of the international lawyer Mahmoud Refaat's reactions on Twitter who changed the situation by his intervention and rescued Rahaf from potential deportation, and in a series of posts said that she had renounced Islam and was concerned that she could be murdered by her family if deported to Saudi Arabia. She also said she had barricaded herself in her hotel room, was refusing to exit until she met with UN representatives, claimed refugee status, and implored embassy officials of various Western nations to assist her in seeking asylum. This drew world-wide support, with more than half a million tweets using the "#SaveRahaf" hashtag. In one tweet, she shared a picture of her passport. Australian ABC journalist Sophie McNeill flew to Bangkok and snuck into her room and barricaded herself with Mohammed to protect her. While barricaded Mohammed also allowed a friend to tweet on her behalf.

Lawyers in Thailand filed an injunction to prevent her forced deportation. The injunction was subsequently dismissed, though an appeal was planned. Thailand's chief of immigration at the Royal Thai Police Surachate Hakparn subsequently confirmed that authorities in the country had acted at the behest of Saudi Arabia.

Mohammed was scheduled to be forcibly repatriated on a flight to Kuwait on 7 January 2019. She barricaded her room to block entry, while at times live streaming airport staff trying to get her to leave the room. She refused to leave. Upon intervention of the international prominent lawyer Mahmoud Refaat, the Thai government later released a statement saying that it would not deport her. François Zimeray, a lawyer chosen by the European Saudi Organisation for Human Rights to defend Mohammed in Bangkok against deportation back to Saudi Arabia, judged that Mohammed's tweets had played an overwhelming role in preventing her deportation. Zimeray stated that the Thai authorities' attitude changed "completely" in "a few minutes" when they realized the strength of international support for Mohammed. Mohammed revealed in a later interview that she wrote a goodbye letter and decided that she would end her life if she was to be forced back to Saudi Arabia.

Initial discrepancies in Thai government's accounts of events 
In an initial assessment on 5 January 2019, Human Rights Watch Asia deputy director Phil Robertson said "the Thai government... (was then) manufacturing a story that she tried to apply for a visa and it was denied... in fact, she had an onward ticket to go to Australia, she didn't want to enter Thailand in the first place." Two days later on 7 January 2019, after international pressure, the Thai official overseeing immigration in the case, Police General Surachate Hakparn, was seen walking beside Mohammed, and stated that "We will not send anyone to die. We will not do that. We will adhere to human rights under the rule of law." Subsequently, she was placed under the care of the United Nations High Commissioner for Refugees (UNHCR), her passport, which had indeed included a valid Australian tourist visa, was returned to her, and formal arrangements for the establishment of her long-term asylum status began.

UN involvement 
The UNHCR issued a statement on 7 January, stating that:

Mohammed subsequently left the airport in the care of the agency, which later granted her refugee status and asked the Australian government to consider granting her asylum. Australian Home Affairs Minister Peter Dutton stated in a radio interview with journalists that Mohammed seemed to be safe in Thailand. With growing concerns over her safety and an unclear timeline how long Australia would take to process her application, the UNHCR referred her case to Canada and her application was processed within several hours.

Asylum in Canada 
On 11 January 2019, Mohammed flew to Toronto via Seoul, having been granted asylum by Canada, as a "resettled refugee". The UNHCR said this had been arranged "on a fast-track 'emergency' basis". She was greeted at Toronto Pearson International Airport by Canadian Minister of Foreign Affairs Chrystia Freeland.

Reaction 
Mohammed's family released a statement disowning her: "We are the family of [Rahaf] Mohammed al-Qunun in Saudi Arabia. We disavow the so-called 'Rahaf al-Qunun' the mentally unstable daughter who has displayed insulting and disgraceful behavior." After learning about her family disavowing her, she decided to drop al-Qunun from her name and to be known as "Rahaf Mohammed." Abdul-Ilah al-Shuaibi, Saudi Arabia's chargé d'affaires in Bangkok, was quoted as saying, in a meeting with the Thai immigration office: "When [Rahaf] first arrived in Thailand, she opened a new [Twitter account] and the followers reached about 45,000 within one day... I wish you had taken her phone, it would have been better than [taking] her passport."

Mohammed's case has been compared to those of Dina Ali Lasloom and Hakeem al-Araibi. Stephen Kalin, writing for Reuters, described Mohammed's case as triggering a new phase in the Saudi anti male-guardianship campaign.

Reaction in Saudi Arabia 
After she was resettled in Canada, the Canadian government was accused by Saudi media of "an attempt at stirring up civil strife by inciting the Kingdom’s teenage girls to abandon social mores" in Okaz.

Personal life 

In 2022, she released her first book, titled Rebel: My Escape From Saudi Arabia to Freedom.

She is bisexual.

See also 
 Human rights in Saudi Arabia
 Women's rights in Saudi Arabia
 Rana Ahmad
 Dina Ali Lasloom
 Saudi Arabia – Thailand relations
 Saudi Arabia – Canada relations
 Convention Relating to the Status of Refugees ("1951 Convention")
 Protocol Relating to the Status of Refugees ("1967 Protocol")

References

External links

2000 births
2019 in Canada
2019 in Saudi Arabia
2019 in Thailand
Rahaf
Bisexual women
Canadian people of Saudi Arabian descent
Canadian women's rights activists
Human rights abuses in Thailand
Human rights abuses in Saudi Arabia
Living people
People from Ha'il Province
Applicants for refugee status in Canada
Right of asylum in Australia
Saudi Arabian former Muslims
Saudi Arabian refugees
Violence against women in Saudi Arabia
Women in Saudi Arabia
Women's rights in Saudi Arabia
Saudi Arabian atheists
21st-century atheists
Former Muslims turned agnostics or atheists
Former Muslim critics of Islam
Canadian critics of Islam